UFC 294 is an upcoming mixed martial arts event produced by the Ultimate Fighting Championship that will take place on October 21, 2023, at the Etihad Arena in Abu Dhabi, United Arab Emirates.

Background
The event will mark the promotion's 18th visit to Abu Dhabi and sixth event at the Etihad Arena.

See also 

 List of UFC events
 List of current UFC fighters
 2023 in UFC

References 

 

Ultimate Fighting Championship events
2023 in mixed martial arts
2023 in Emirati sport
Mixed martial arts in the United Arab Emirates
Sports competitions in Abu Dhabi
October 2023 sports events in Asia
Scheduled mixed martial arts events